Pagibete is a Bantu language spoken in the Democratic Republic of Congo. It is similar to Bwa, and might be considered a dialect.

Writing system

References

 

Bwa languages
Languages of the Democratic Republic of the Congo